"Baby Don't Stop" is a song recorded by South Korean boy group NCT U, the first unit of NCT under the management of SM Entertainment, serving as the second single of NCT's debut studio album NCT 2018 Empathy. The song is a duet sung by NCT members Ten and Taeyong. by Musically, "Baby Don't Stop" was described as a lush art house tune featuring a powerful, stark bass beat laid over sultry synths, dramatic raps, and passionate whispers.

Track listing 

 NCT 2018 EMPATHY

 "Baby Don't Stop" – 3:03

 Baby Don't Stop (Special Thai Version)

 "Baby Don't Stop (Special Thai Version)" – 3:03
 "Baby Don't Stop (Instrumental)" – 3:03

Accolades

Charts

References 

2018 songs
NCT (band) songs
SM Entertainment singles